Lady for a Day was an Australian television game show which aired from 1960 to 1962 on Melbourne station HSV-7. Hosted by American Larry K. Nixon, the first episode aired 8 August 1960 while the final episode aired 8 August 1962. It was based on controversial US series Queen for a Day. Each episode was 60 minutes, and the series aired 5 days a week. 

The National Film and Sound Archive holds a copy of the opening and closing sequences of the program, and also a compilation of Australian programs with American hosts, in which the program is featured.

References

Seven Network original programming
1960 Australian television series debuts
1962 Australian television series endings
Black-and-white Australian television shows
English-language television shows
1960s Australian game shows
Television game shows with incorrect disambiguation